The 2006–07 season was the 85th season in the history of SD Ponferradina and the club's first season ever in the second division of Spanish football. In addition to the domestic league, Ponferradina participated in this season's edition of the Copa del Rey.

Competitions

Overall record

Segunda División

League table

Results summary

Results by round

Matches

Copa del Rey

References

SD Ponferradina seasons
Ponferradina